The 2007 Montana State Bobcats football team was an American football team that represented Montana State University in the Big Sky Conference (Big Sky) during the 2007 NCAA Division I FCS football season. In their first season under head coach Rob Ash, the Bobcats compiled a 6–5 record (4–4 against Big Sky opponents) and tied for fourth place in the Big Sky.

Schedule

References

Montana State
Montana State Bobcats football seasons
Montana State Bobcats football